Pestilence is a Dutch death metal band from Enschede, founded in 1986. There have been numerous lineup changes with the band over their -year career, with guitarist and vocalist Patrick Mameli as the only constant member. After disbanding in order to pursue other musical directions in 1994, Pestilence reunited in 2008, and was put on a "permanent hold" in July 2014. However, the band reunited once again in October 2016. To date, Pestilence has released nine studio albums, and they are often known as part of "progressive death metal's Big Four", along with Death, Atheist, and Cynic.

History

Early career (1986–1990)
Pestilence started in the Netherlands in mid-1986 as a thrash metal band. The
lineup, consisting of Patrick Mameli (guitar, vocals), Randy Meinhard (guitar), and Marco Foddis (drums), recorded two demos before gaining the attention of Roadrunner Records. After the first demo, Martin van Drunen (bass, vocals) joined them. These two demos – Dysentery (1987) and The Penance (1987) – are raw, sounding mostly like a cross between Possessed and Schizophrenia-era Sepultura. After signing with Roadrunner, Pestilence released their debut album, Malleus Maleficarum, in 1988, further refining their approach to thrash metal. The new material was tighter and more focused than the demos. It set a new standard of brutality and became a definition of European death/thrash metal.

Meanwhile, Pestilence recruited a new guitar player, Patrick Uterwijk. In 1989, the band released their second album, Consuming Impulse, a turn toward death metal. Musically, things became heavier and more haunting. Vocally, Martin van Drunen moved away from cleaner vocals in favour of a more acidic growl. With its release, Pestilence gained international attention, and became highly regarded worldwide by death metal fans. The band embarked on a tour to support the album, playing a series of dates with Celtic Frost, Death, Carcass, Napalm Death, Morbid Angel and Bolt Thrower, among others. By the time they began working on their third album, the lineup changed once again; vocalist and bassist Martin van Drunen departed to front Asphyx.

Success and breakthrough (1991–1994)
Pestilence were faced with the challenge of replacing another member once again, being now without a vocalist and bassist. For their third album Testimony of the Ancients (1991), they enlisted bassist Tony Choy from death metal band Cynic while Patrick Mameli took over the vocal duties. A more technical and progressive approach, Testimony of the Ancients co-defined early progressive death metal alongside Piece of Time and Human musical and lyrical-wise, with "Land of Tears" getting heavy rotation on Headbangers Ball worldwide. In support of Testimony of the Ancients, Pestilence toured with Death again, and also shared dates with Napalm Death, Cannibal Corpse, Entombed and Dismember.

However, Tony Choy was never a permanent member, and ended up going back to Florida to eventually play with Atheist. In the meantime, Pestilence enlisted the talents of Jeroen Paul Thesseling.

Over the years, Pestilence members were getting into other forms of music, primarily jazz fusion. The band's fourth album, Spheres (1993), was an even more complex affair, mixing jazz elements into their death metal style while also incorporating guitar synths throughout the album.

Pestilence's popularity had risen with the release of each album, but unfortunately, so did tensions between the members. After a short period of time, the band unanimously decided to split up, feeling they had reached their creative climax.

Post-breakup (1995–2007)
In 1994, Roadrunner released one last CD from Pestilence: a best-of titled Mind Reflections, containing tracks from all four albums, plus the rare song "Hatred Within" (originally released on the Teutonic Invasion Part II compilation) and six unreleased live tracks recorded at the Dynamo Open Air Festival in 1992. In 1998, Displeased Records re-released the debut album Malleus Maleficarum (which was originally never officially released in Europe), and included both demo recordings from 1986 and 1987.

In 2006, Metal War Productions, working with Martin van Drunen, released Chronicles of the Scourge, containing two concert recordings and one unreleased bonus track.  The two concerts are Live "Kix Festival" – Veghel, the Netherlands (24 June 1989) and Live Bochum, Germany (18 November 1988). A bonus "rehearsal disc" was released with the first 1000 copies.

First reunion (2008–2013)

After a long period of inactivity the band returned in January 2008, The reunion line-up consisted of Mameli on vocals and guitar, Tony Choy on bass and Peter Wildoer on drums. Speaking to Blabbermouth.net regarding his decision to resurrect the band, Mameli had this to say:
It's not a reunion, because I will not be playing with any of the old lineup guys, except Tony Choy, of course so... I always stated there WILL NEVER BE a reunion, and there won't be, since I never look back at the past and I refuse now to play with people that are not on the same musical level as I am.

I sang on Testimony and Spheres (two albums later from Consuming Impulse!!), so no need for Martin. This because of the above statement I just made. Furthermore, Martin is doing other things. Good for him.

So now you have two members that were in Pestilence before and one new guy.

The reason why I bring Pestilence back to life is that people/fans keep asking me for this. The time is right now and Mascot is giving me the opportunity to do so.

As you know, I have always been the driving force behind Pestilence, writing all the music and so forth, so that I can state: I will bring back Pestilence to life. More tech and way more brutal than ever before.

In 2008, Pestilence decided to write and record new music for an early 2009 release working with Danish producer Jacob Hansen. Titled Resurrection Macabre, it is their first original album in sixteen years (since 1993's Spheres). In March 2008, Patrick Uterwijk re-joined the band as second-guitarist, however he didn't play on Resurrection Macabre.

In October 2009, Jeroen Paul Thesseling re-joined Pestilence after fifteen years of separation from the band, replacing Tony Choy's bass position. In March 2010, Pestilence announced their first US summer tour in over 16 years which would begin at Maryland Deathfest at Sonar on 30 May. The reformed Pestilence released another album entitled Doctrine in April 2011.

On 22 February 2012, Patrick Mameli announced that Jeroen Paul Thesseling and Yuma van Eekelen both left Pestilence, to commit more on their main projects, Thesseling's Salazh Trio, and van Eekelen's Exivious. Thesseling was replaced by Stephan Fimmers (Necrophagist), and van Eekelen was replaced by Tim Yeung (Morbid Angel, Divine Heresy, All That Remains, Hate Eternal). The new two members were also included in the recording session of the seventh Pestilence album, Obsideo.

Second breakup and reunion (2014–present)
On 8 July 2014, vocalist/guitarist Patrick Mameli announced that Pestilence was on a "permanent hold", as he wanted to "concentrate fully" on his new project Neuromorph.

On 4 October 2016, Pestilence announced on their Facebook page that they were once again active, and announced a new lineup, featuring Mameli on both guitar and vocals, Tony Choy on bass (later replaced by Tilen Hudrap), Santiago Dobles on lead guitar and Septimiu Hărşan on drums.

On 22 February 2017, the band announced via their Facebook page that a new album, titled Hadeon, was due to be released in 2017. The album's release date was later pushed back to 2018, and was finally released on 9 March 2018.

On 24 July 2018, shortly before the bands North America tour was to begin, the metal website MetalSucks reported on a 2017 Facebook post that they alleged showed Patrick Mameli on his personal Facebook profile, in response to a photo of him with blonde dreadlocks, responding to a comment that compared his look to Milli Vanilli with the statement in his native Dutch, "Je zegt dat ik een neger ben?" The site alleged that the use of "neger" translated to the racial epithet nigger. Along with the comment, MetalSucks also alleged that the singer also "propagates Jewish stereotypes", pointing to his support of United States President Donald Trump moving the nations embassy in Israel.  Many commenters on the site pointed out that the website used a Facebook translation on the post that translated it to a-more offensive variant, while Google Translate would return "black" or "negro". Due to the controversy generated from the article, the band's entire U.S. tour was cancelled. In a post on Mameli's Facebook page, he stated, "Thanks to metalsucks and their followers, our US minitour has been cancelled by our U.S. promotor[sic]."

On 24 September 2018, Tilen Hudrap announced that he is leaving Pestilence in order to join U.D.O. Edward Negrea of Necrovile was announced as replacement. The band also announced that new music, touring and festival appearances were planned for 2019.

On 1 August 2019, Pestilence announced that they had signed to Agonia Records and would release their then-upcoming ninth studio album Exitivm in the coming months. Several months later, Pestilence announced that Septimiu Hărşan had to leave the band due to restrictions caused by the COVID-19 pandemic; he was replaced by Michiel van der Plicht (God Dethroned and Carach Angren). After a two-year delay, Exitivm was released on 25 June 2021.

In March 2022, Pestilence announced on their Facebook page that they had finished eight songs for their upcoming tenth studio album Portals, with four more tracks to be completed.

Members

Current lineup
 Patrick Mameli – guitars (1986–1994, 2008–2014, 2016–present), vocals (1986–1987, 1990–1994, 2008–2014, 2016–present)
 Joost van der Graaf – bass (2019–present)
 Rutger van Noordenburg – guitars (2019–present)
 Michiel van der Plicht – drums (2020–present)

Session musicians
 Kent Smith – keyboards (1991)
 Jack Dodd – bass (1992)

Former members
 Patrick Uterwijk – guitars (1988–1994, 2008–2014)
 Marco Foddis – drums (1986–1994)
 Randy Meinhart – guitars (1986–1989)
 Martin van Drunen – vocals, bass (1987–1990)
 Tony Choy – bass (1991–1992, 2008–2009, 2016–2017)
 Jeroen Paul Thesseling – bass (1992–1994, 2009–2012)
 Stephan Fimmers – bass (2012–2013)
 George Maier – bass (2013–2014)
 Peter Wildoer – drums (2008)
 Yuma Van Eekelen – drums (2009–2012)
 Tim Yeung – drums (2012)
 Dave Haley – drums (2012–2014)
 Santiago Dobles – guitars (2016–2017)
 Septimiu Hărşan – drums (2016–2020)
 Tilen Hudrap – bass (2017–2018)
 Edward Negrea – bass (2018–2019)
 Calin Paraschiv – guitars (2017–2019)

Timeline

Discography

Studio albums
Malleus Maleficarum (1988)
Consuming Impulse (1989)
Testimony of the Ancients (1991)
Spheres (1993)
Resurrection Macabre (2009)
Doctrine (2011)
Obsideo (2013)
Hadeon (2018)
Exitivm (2021)
Portals (TBA)

Demos
Dysentery (1987)
The Penance (1987)

Compilations
Mind Reflections (1994)

Live albums
 Chronicles of the Scourge (2006)
 Presence of the Past (2015)

Notes
 Spheres

References

External links
 

Dutch heavy metal musical groups
Dutch death metal musical groups
Dutch thrash metal musical groups
Technical death metal musical groups
1986 establishments in the Netherlands
Musical groups established in 1986
Musical groups disestablished in 1994
Musical groups disestablished in 2014
Musical groups reestablished in 2008
Musical groups reestablished in 2016
Musical quartets